An administrative proceeding is a non-judicial determination of fault or wrongdoing and may include, in some cases, penalties of various forms.  They are typically conducted by government or military institutions.

In a military setting, a "Captain's Mast", held by a commanding officer of a U.S. Navy unit is one such administrative proceeding. As a consequence of the proceeding, the commander may impose non-judicial punishment upon members of the command.

Various other administrations of government (for example, a department regulating motor vehicles, air pollution, forestry practices, or real estate sales agents) may impose fines or revocation of permits or licenses upon persons or corporations for acts of commission or omission found to be violating operating, permitting, reporting, or other rules. Such rules are typically formulated in the specific by the administrative authority under general authority established and limited by statute.

There may be additional paths of judicial appeal in some cases, provided all appeal paths internal to the administrative group have been exhausted. In general, such appeals are usually not based on the determination of fact (unless relevant evidence was not allowed to be presented), but rather on some legal theory that the administrative body exceeded its statutory authority, or that the administrative body did not follow its own established rules of procedure, or that the authorising statute itself or the subsequently derived rules are defective in some way, for example by being an unconstitutional infringement of some constitutional right. In these cases the case may be remanded to the authority for further examination and determination under the new rules established by the court or the administrative decision may be declared null and void with prejudice.

See also
Legal proceeding

Common law legal terminology
Administrative law